Eater is a food website by Vox Media. It was co-founded by Lockhart Steele and Ben Leventhal in 2005, and originally focused on dining and nightlife in New York City. Eater launched a national site in 2009, and covered nearly 20 cities by 2012. Vox Media acquired Eater, along with two others comprising the Curbed Network, in late 2013. In 2017, Eater had around 25 local sites in the United States, Canada, and England. The site has been recognized four times by the James Beard Foundation Awards.

Description and history
The food and dining site Eater is a brand of the digital media company Vox Media. It serves as a local restaurant guide, offering reviews as well as news about the restaurant industry. The property earns revenue via advertising, sometimes displaying content generated by Vox Creative.

Eater was co-founded by Lockhart Steele and Ben Leventhal in July 2005, and initially focused on New York City's dining and nightlife scenes. The blog was one of three comprising the Curbed Network, founded by Steele in 2004, along with the real estate and fashion networks called Curbed and Racked, respectively. By 2007, Eater was receiving tens of thousands of readers per day. After expanding into Los Angeles and San Francisco, the network went national in 2009, and covered approximately 20 cities and one U.S. state (Maine) by mid 2012.

Vox Media purchased the Curbed Network for approximately $30 million in November 2013. Traffic to Eater increased by 250 percent following the acquisition. In early 2014, Business Insider reported that Eater was generating approximately 2 million of Vox Media's 45 million unique monthly visitors, according to the analytics company comScore. The site began using Vox Media's content management system, Chorus, and producing more video content. Steele said he sold Eater partly to observe Chorus' influence on the site. The platform allows Eater to enhance map, journalistic, and visual features, and improves user engagement via forums.

In mid 2017, Eater launched a London site, the network's first outside North America. Eater hosted 23 sites for cities in the United States and Canada at the time.

The 25 cities (and states) listed on the Eater website (1/2021) are: Atlanta; 
Austin; 
Boston; 
Carolinas; 
Chicago; 
Dallas; 
Denver; 
Detroit; 
Houston; 
Las Vegas, Nevada; 
London, U.K.; 
Los Angeles; 
Miami; 
Montréal, PQ, Canada; 
Nashville; 
New Orleans; 
New York City; 
Philadelphia; 
Phoenix; 
Portland, Oregon; 
San Diego; 
San Francisco;  
Seattle; 
Twin Cities, Minnesota; and
Washington, DC

In 2021, Vox Media acquired drinks website Punch as a brand within Eater.

Programming
Eater produced a web series called Savvy, which featured chefs, restaurateurs, and sommeliers discussing dishes and cooking techniques. The program's second season aired in 2015. In 2017, Vox Media greenlit the series Cult Following and You Can Do This for Eater.

Eater and PBS collaborated on a six-episode documentary television show about the cuisine of immigrant neighborhoods throughout the U.S., hosted by chef and restaurateur Marcus Samuelsson. The show, No Passport Required, marked Eater first television production project. Vox Entertainment produced the show, which premiered in July 2018. Vox Media executives Jim Bankoff and Marty Moe serve as two of several executive producers.

In January 2018, Eater and SB Nation aired an online three-episode celebrity cooking competition series sponsored by PepsiCo. The show featured National Football League players Greg Jennings, Rashad Jennings, and Nick Mangold as competitors, as well as chefs Anne Burrell and Josh Capon.

Leadership and editorial staff
Eater was initially led by co-founders Leventhal and Steele, who had the titles "Head Eater" and CEO, respectively. Steele, who also served as president of the Curbed Network, ranked number 34 in The Daily Meal 2011 list of "America's 50 Most Powerful People in Food", for his role as a founder of Eater.

In 2014, Amanda Kludt was named Eater first editor-in-chief, and Robert Sietsema was hired to be a New York-based food writer.

Reception
Food & Wine has called Eater "required reading". In 2006, the magazine included Steele and Leventhal in their "Tastemaker Awards" list, recognizing fifteen people who had significant impact on the food and wine industries by age 35, for their "ingenious" posts.

The network's content has been recognized four times by the James Beard Foundation Awards, established to honor excellence in cuisine, food writing, and culinary education in the United States. Eater received four additional nominations in 2018.

See also
 List of websites about food and drink

References

External links
 

2005 establishments in the United States
Vox Media
Websites about food and drink